Local elections to Northumberland County Council, a county council in the north east of England, were held on 7 June 2001. It was the first election to be held under new ward boundaries that increased the number of seats from 66 to 67. The Labour Party retained overall control of the council.

Results

References

External links
Northumberland County Council

2001
2001 English local elections
21st century in Northumberland
June 2001 events in the United Kingdom